Dallington Heath is a heath in the West Northamptonshire district, in the ceremonial county of Northamptonshire, England, notable for its complex of crop marks.

References 

Heaths of the United Kingdom
West Northamptonshire District